Thereva plebeja  is a Palearctic species of stiletto fly in the family Therevidae.

References

External links
Images representing  Thereva plebeja 

Therevidae
Insects described in 1758
Taxa named by Carl Linnaeus